The 2011 ICC World Cricket League Division Seven was a cricket tournament took place from 1 to 8 May 2011. It formed part of the ICC World Cricket League and qualifying for the 2015 Cricket World Cup. Botswana hosted the event.

Teams
The teams that took part in the tournament was in the tournament were decided according to the results of the 2009 ICC World Cricket League Division Seven, the 2009 ICC World Cricket League Division Six and the 2010 ICC World Cricket League Division Eight.

Squads

Fixtures

Group stage

Points table

Matches

Playoffs

5th place playoff

3rd place playoff

Final

Statistics

Most runs
The top five highest run scorers (total runs) are included in this table.

Most wickets
The following table contains the five leading wicket-takers.

Final Placings

After the conclusion of the tournament the teams were distributed as follows:

References

https://web.archive.org/web/20120406115546/http://icc-cricket.yahoo.net/newsdetails.php?newsId=13910_1302162060

2011 Division Seven
Sports competitions in Botswana
Cricket in Botswana
International sports competitions hosted by Botswana
Sport in Gaborone